Musictech may refer to:

MusicTech, a magazine and website published by BandLab Technologies
McNally Smith College of Music, formerly known as Musictech College